St. Jacob or Saint Jacob is a village in Madison County, Illinois, United States. The population was 1,358 at the 2020 census, up from 1,098 in 2010.

History
St. Jacob derives its name from Jacob Schutz, who operated a store, saloon and tavern called the St. Jacob House. Earl E. Herrin (1892–1964), Illinois state representative and businessman, was born in St. Jacob.

Geography
St. Jacob is located in southeastern Madison County at  (38.716897, -89.767122). U.S. Route 40 passes through the north side of the village, leading northeast  to Highland and west the same distance to Troy.

The village drains west to tributaries of Silver Creek, a south-flowing tributary of the Kaskaskia River.

Demographics

At the 2000 census there were 801 people, 301 households, and 232 families in the village. The racial makeup of the village was 98.25% White, 0.50% Native American, 0.37% Asian, 0.50% from other races, and 0.37% from two or more races. Hispanic or Latino of any race were 1.75%.

Of the 301 households 37.2% had children under the age of 18 living with them, 67.8% were married couples living together, 6.0% had a female householder with no husband present, and 22.9% were non-families. 19.6% of households were one person and 9.0% were one person aged 65 or older. The average household size was 2.66 and the average family size was 3.01.

The age distribution was 27.8% under the age of 18, 8.0% from 18 to 24, 30.3% from 25 to 44, 22.7% from 45 to 64, and 11.1% 65 or older. The median age was 34 years. For every 100 females, there were 99.8 males. For every 100 females age 18 and over, there were 95.9 males.

The median household income was $47,917 and the median family income  was $55,417. Males had a median income of $36,000 versus $25,938 for females. The per capita income for the village was $20,340. About 3.3% of families and 9.7% of the population were below the poverty line, including 18.5% of those under age 18 and none of those age 65 or over.

See also
St. Jacob Township, Madison County, Illinois

References

External links 
 

Villages in Madison County, Illinois
Villages in Illinois